Fabiana Semprebom (born May 26, 1984) is a Brazilian model.

Biography 
Fabiana Semprebom was born in Londrina, Paraná. She is the daughter of a Brazilian father and an Italian-American mother.

Career 
She is represented by Louisa Models, Supreme, Ford Models (New York/LA), Mega Models (São Paulo), 1st Option Model Management (Copenhagen), Women Management (Milan), Ford Models Europe (Paris). She was discovered by an agent from São Paulo while she was shopping at a local mall.

She has modelled for Dolce & Gabbana, and appeared in Vanity Fair in 2007. In 2010 she walked in the Victoria's Secret Fashion Show.

References

External links

1984 births
Living people
People from Londrina
Brazilian people of American descent
Brazilian people of Italian descent
Brazilian female models